New Jewish Cemetery may refer to:

 New Jewish Cemetery, Prague
 New Jewish Cemetery, Kraków